Analaitivu (Annaladūva) is an island off the coast of Jaffna peninsula in northern Sri Lanka, located approximately  west of the city of Jaffna. The island is divided into two Village Officer Divisions (Analaitivu North and Analaitivu South) whose combined population was 1,781 at the 2012 census.

Analaitivu is divided into seven wards each corresponding to a major settlement. There are number of Hindu temples and a few churches on the island. It has no causeway connecting it to the mainland or other islands but is served by a ferry service from Kayts on the neighbouring island of Velanaitivu.

References

External links

Islands of Jaffna District
Island North DS Division